Mario Muscat (born 18 August 1976 in Paola, Malta) is a former professional footballer and manager.

Muscat spent the majority of his football career with the Hibernians in the Maltese Premier League and was capped over 60 times with the Maltese national team.

Playing career

Hibernians
Muscat began his career in the 1993–94 season, when he was called into the first team squad of Hibernians. Although at the start of his career, in his debut he helped Hibernians to win the Maltese Premier League title. He went on to make a total of 18 appearances throughout the season.

Continuing with Hibernians into the 1994–95 season again won the Maltese Premier League title.  He went on to make 12 appearances.

In the 1995–96 season, Muscat went on to record 13 appearances, as Hibernians finished in fourth position in the Maltese Premier League. Despite Muscat failing to win the title with Hibernians for the third time, he was rewarded with a spot within Maltese national football team during the season.

Muscat went into the 1996–97 season hoping to emulate the form that had seen him called up to the national team. However, Hibernians recorded a disappointing finish in the Maltese Premier League. Muscat went on to make 15 appearances during the season.

The 1997–98 season saw Muscat continue form for Hibernians and the national team. He helped Hibernians improve on their previous league position with a finish in the Maltese Premier League.  Muscat went on to make 23 appearances, and aided the club to win the Maltese Cup and winning the Maltese Player of the Year award.

With Hibernians winning more matches as the seasons went on, Muscat continued to contribute more and showed this during the 1998–99 season. Muscat made 26 appearances, as Hibernians again recorded a  finish in the Maltese Premier League.

Muscat went into the 1999–2000 season, hoping to help Hibernians improve on their previous league position. The season saw Hibernians finish in sixth position in the Maltese Premier League, with Muscat making 24 appearances.

The 2000–01 season saw Muscat going on to make 25 appearances and even scored a goal.

After a lengthy absence, Mario Muscat joined Hibernians' return to the summit of Maltese football, as they were crowned champions of the Maltese Premier League for the 2001–02 season. He went on to make 26 appearances.

Despite the success of the previous season, Muscat and Hibernians could not emulate the same achievement during the 2002–03 season. The club went on to finish the season in fourth position in the Maltese Premier League, with Muscat making 28 appearances.

In the 2003–04 season, the club went on to finish one place better than the previous season, in third position. Mario Muscat made 27 appearances during the season.

The 2004–05 season saw Muscat and Hibernians secure another finish in the Maltese Premier League. He went on to make 27 appearances.

Muscat continued into the 2005–06 season, he joined Hibernians to secure a finish in the Maltese Premier League, making 24 appearances. He also joined the club in winning the Maltese Cup.

Muscat went into the 2006–07 season with the Hibernians, securing the Maltese Cup for the second consecutive season. On the domestic front, Hibernians finished in fifth position in the Maltese Premier League, with Muscat making 25 appearances.

In the 2007–08 season, the club finished the first phase of the season in the relegation pool. They finished the season in seventh position. Muscat went on to make 19 appearances. However, they won the Maltese Super Cup.

Mario Muscat and Hibernians went from one extreme to the other during the 2008–09 season. Under the guidance of new manager Mark Miller, the club beat Valletta by two points to win the Maltese Premier League title. Muscat made 28 appearances.

In the 2009–10 season, his club went on to finish the season in sixth position in the Maltese Premier League.

Career statistics
Statistics accurate as of match played 9 August 2009.

Honours
Hibernians
 Maltese Premier League: 1993–94, 1994–95, 2001–02, 2008–09
 Maltese FA Trophy: 1997–98, 2005–06, 2006–07, 2011–12, 2012–13
 Maltese Super Cup: 2007

Individual
 Maltese Player of the Year: 1997–98

See also
 List of men

References

External links
 
 
 Mario Muscat at

1976 births
Living people
Maltese footballers
Malta international footballers
Hibernians F.C. players
Association football goalkeepers
Maltese Premier League players
Vittoriosa Stars F.C. players
Hibernians F.C. managers
Maltese Premier League managers
Maltese football managers